Franz Kramer (January 20, 1865 – April 18, 1924) was a seaman serving in the United States Navy during the Spanish–American War who received the Medal of Honor for bravery.

Biography
Kramer was born January 20, 1865,  in Germany and after entering the navy was sent to fight in the Spanish–American War aboard the U.S.S. Marblehead as a seaman.

On May 11, 1898,  the Marblehead was given the task of cutting the cable leading from Cienfuegos, Cuba. During the operation and facing heavy enemy fire, Kramer continued to perform his duties throughout this action.

He died on April 18, 1924, in New York City and is buried in Calvary Cemetery, Woodside, New York.

Medal of Honor citation
Rank and organization: Seaman, U.S. Navy. Born. January 20, 1865, Germany. G.O. No.: 521, July 7, 1899.

Citation:

On board the U.S.S. Marblehead during the operation of cutting the cable leading from Cienfuegos, Cuba, May 11, 1898. Facing the heavy fire of the enemy, Kramer set an example of extraordinary bravery and coolness throughout this action.

See also

List of Medal of Honor recipients for the Spanish–American War

References

External links

1865 births
1924 deaths
United States Navy Medal of Honor recipients
United States Navy sailors
American military personnel of the Spanish–American War
Military personnel from New York City
German emigrants to the United States
German-born Medal of Honor recipients
Spanish–American War recipients of the Medal of Honor
People from Mainz-Bingen